New Germany Nature Reserve is a protected area of coastal grassland and forest overlooking the suburb of New Germany outside of Pinetown, KwaZulu-Natal, South Africa.  The reserve consists of a nature park featuring a walk-through aviary and snake display, and grasslands to the south of the park which can be explored by foot.

The reserve is home to a number of bird species, including the Natal robin and purple-crested Turaco.  Small mammals such as the blue and common duiker, impala, and mongoose are also found in the reserve.

History 
The reserve was demarcated as a common for the grazing of livestock and gathering of firewood by German settlers who arrived in the area in 1848.

References 

Nature reserves in South Africa